Echis jogeri, known as the Joger's carpet viper, Mali carpet viper, Joger's saw-scaled viper, is a species of venomous snake in the family Viperidae. The species is endemic to Mali. There are no subspecies which are recognized as being valid.

Etymology
The specific name, jogeri, is in honor of German herpetologist Ulrich Joger.

Description
Its build, however, is relatively stout, the cross-section of which is circular or subtriangular. The scalation of the head is similar to that of E. leucogaster. Midbody, the dorsal scale rows number 27. The ventral scales number 123-136.

Coloration and pattern are both variable. Its color ranges from brown to gray to reddish, and everything in between. Its pattern generally consists of a series of light, oblique, dorsal crossbars or saddles set against a darker ground color. The flanks are lighter in color, normally with a series of triangular, subtriangular, or circular, dark markings with light or white edges. The belly is an unbroken pale cream, white, or ivory.

Geographic range
Echis jogeri is found only in western and central Mali.

The type locality is listed in Russian as "[Mali, 3 km of Tombuktu]" (Mali, 3 km from Timbuktu).

References

Further reading
Cherlin VA (1990). [A taxonomic revision of the snake genus Echis (Viperidae). II. An analysis of taxonomy and description of new forms]. [Proc. Zool. Inst. Leningrad ] 207: 193-223. (in Russian).

External links

Viperinae
Endemic fauna of Mali
Reptiles described in 1990